Xiangyang District is a district of the city of Hegang, Heilongjiang province, China.

Administrative divisions 
Xiangyang District is divided into 5 subdistricts. 
5 subdistricts
 Beishan, Hongjun, Guangming, Shengli, Nanyi

Notes and references 

Xiangyang, Hegang